Wyoming Highway 138 (WYO 138) was a  east-west (southwest-northeast) Wyoming State Road in central Fremont County.

Route description
Wyoming Highway 138 began on its western end at Wyoming Highway 789 east of Hudson. WYO 138 proceeded in a northeasterly direction, and traveled through the community (CDP) of Arapahoe. Just northeast of Arapahoe, WYO 138 reached Wyoming Highway 137 in the unincorporated community of St. Stephens where it ended. Together with WYO 137, Highway 138 provided an alternate to WYO 789 by staying closer to the Popo Agie River.

History
A resolution to relinquish the highway to the Bureau of Indian Affairs was approved by the Transportation Commission of Wyoming at a meeting on December 9, 2010.

Major intersections

References

External links 

Wyoming State Routes 100-199
WYO 137 - WYO 789 to WYO 137

Transportation in Fremont County, Wyoming
137